Vimāna are mythological flying palaces or chariots described in Hindu texts and Sanskrit epics. The "Pushpaka Vimana" of Ravana (who took it from Kubera; Rama returned it to Kubera) is the most quoted example of a vimana. Vimanas are also mentioned in Jain texts.

Etymology

The Sanskrit word vimāna (विमान) literally means "measuring out, traversing" or "having been measured out". Monier Monier-Williams defines vimāna as "a car or a chariot of the gods, any self-moving aerial car sometimes serving as a seat or throne, sometimes self-moving and carrying its occupant through the air; other descriptions make the Vimana more like a house or palace, and one kind is said to be seven stories high", and quotes the Pushpaka Vimana of Ravana as an example. It may denote any car or vehicle, especially a bier or a ship as well as a palace of an emperor, especially with seven stories. Nowadays, vimāna, vimān or biman means "aircraft" in Indian languages. For example in the town name Vimanapura (a suburb of Bangalore) and Vimannagar, a town in Pune. In another context, Vimana is a feature in Hindu temple architecture.

Vedas

The predecessors of the flying vimanas of the Sanskrit epics are the flying chariots employed by various gods in the Vedas: the Sun (see Sun chariot) and Indra and several other Vedic deities are transported by flying wheeled chariots pulled by animals, usually horses.

The existing Rigveda versions do not mention vimanas, but verses from, RV 1.164.47-48, also known as The Riddle Hymn, were taken as evidence for a spacecraft by Indian philosopher and social leader Dayananda Saraswati who believed in the infallible authority of the Vedas.

47. 
 
48. 
 

47. Along the dark course, tawny well-feathered (birds) [=flames], clothing themselves in the waters, fly up toward heaven.|
These have returned here (as rain) from the seat of truth [=heaven]. Only then is the earth moistened with ghee.||
48. The chariot-wheel (of the Sun) is one, its wheel-segments are twelve, its wheel-naves are three: who understands this?|
They [=the days] that wander on and on are fitted together on that, like three hundred pegs, like sixty (more).|| 
-Translator: [Stephanie W. Jamison, Joel P. Brereton]

Dayananda Saraswati interpreted these verses to mean:
"jumping into space speedily with a craft using fire and water ... containing twelve stamghas (pillars), one wheel, three machines, 300 pivots, and 60 instruments."

Others may interpret it merely as a flowery way of saying the year is made of 12 months or 3 seasons or about 360 days.

Hindu epics

Ramayana
In the Ramayana, the pushpaka ("flowery") vimana of Ravana is described as follows:
"The Pushpaka Vimana that resembles the Sun and belongs to my brother was brought by the powerful Ravana; that aerial and excellent Vimana going everywhere at will ... that chariot resembling a bright cloud in the sky ... and the King [Rama] got in, and the excellent chariot at the command of the Raghira, rose up into the higher atmosphere.'''"

It is the first flying vimana mentioned in existing Hindu texts (as distinct from the gods' flying horse-drawn chariots).
Pushpaka was originally made by Vishvakarma for Brahma, the Hindu god of creation; later Brahma gave it to Kubera, the God of wealth; but it was later stolen, along with Lanka, by his half-brother, king Ravana.

Jain literature
These Vaimānika deities dwell in the Ūrdhva Loka heavens.
According to the Kalpa Sūtra of Bhadra-bāhu, the 24th  himself emerged from the great ; whereas the 22nd  emerged from the great vimāna Aparijita.
A vimāna may be seen in a dream, such as the nalinī-gulma.Mewar Encyclopedia, s.v. "Ranakpur, founding of" 

 Ashoka Edict IV 
Ashoka mentions vimana (an "aerial chariot") as part of the festivities or procession which were organised during his reign.

Vaimānika Shāstra

The Vaimānika Shāstra is an early 20th-century Sanskrit text on aeronautics, obtained allegedly by mental channeling, about the construction of vimānas, the "chariots of the Gods". The existence of the text was revealed in 1952 by G. R. Josyer, according to whom it was written by one Pandit Subbaraya Shastry, who dictated it in 1918–1923. A Hindi translation was published in 1959, the Sanskrit text with an English translation in 1973. It has 3000 shlokas in 8 chapters. Subbaraya Shastry allegedly stated that the content was dictated to him by Maharishi Bharadvaja. A study by aeronautical and mechanical engineering at Indian Institute of Science, Bangalore in 1974 concluded that the aircraft described in the text were "poor concoctions" and that the author showed a complete lack of understanding of aeronautics.

Ayyavazhi

Pushpak Vimana, meaning "an aeroplane with flowers", is a mythical aeroplane found in Ayyavazhi mythology. Akilattirattu Ammanai, the religious book of Ayyavazhi, says that the Pushpak Vimana was sent to carry Ayya Vaikundar to Vaikundam.

A similar reference is found in regards of Saint Tukaram, Maharashtra, India. Lord Vishnu was so impressed by the devotion and singing of Saint Tukaram that when his time came, a Pushpak Viman (a heavenly aircraft shaped as an eagle) came to take him to heaven. Though it is believed that every other human being can go to Heaven without body, Saint Tukaram went to heaven with body (Sadeha Swarga Prapti).

In popular culture
Vimanas have appeared in books, films, internet, games, etc., including:
 Vimana is an arcade game from Toaplan wherein the player's ship earns the name.
 In Noctis, a space exploration game, an interstellar propulsion system called the "Vimana Drive" is used.
 The psy-trance producers Etnica released 'Vimana' in 1997 with samples drawn from the film 'Roswell', which includes references to UFOs and alien life forms.
 In Fate/Zero, Gilgamesh has a vimana in his Gate of Babylon.
 In Fate/Grand Order, God Arjuna is shown to use a Vimana for transportation during the 4th Lostbelt.
 In The Objective, a 2008 horror-thriller movie, a US Special Forces ODA searches for vimanas in Afghanistan.
 In the game Deep Labyrinth, the labyrinth is referred to as Vimana by its caretakers.
 Michael Scott (Irish author) wrote The Secrets of the Immortal Nicholas Flamel, a fantasy series that included flying vimanas in the later books.
 In 'Magic Strikes', the third Kate Daniels series Urban Fantasy novel by Ilona Andrews, the climax of the novel takes place on the Pushpaka Vimana. 
 The Emperor's Riddles, a 2014 Indian mystery thriller novel by Satyarth Nayak explores the Vimanas of ancient India.
 In the film Children Who Chase Lost Voices the flying arks are referred to as Shakuna Vimanas.
 In the PC game La-Mulana, Vimanas are the sub boss of the Tower of The Goddess
 The TV show Ancient Aliens often theorizes that the texts were describing alien space ships.
 It was mentioned in the 2013 American found footage sci-fi horror film Skinwalker Ranch.
 The movie Castle in the Sky, from 1986, depicts a flying city named Laputa (resembling a vimana) that was created by an extinct civilization with god-like technology.
 The book Pearl of Great Price, from 1851, by the founder of The Church of Jesus Christ, mentions that Enoch built a fabulous [flying] city that was "taken up to heaven" by God.
 The book Survive: The Atlantis Grail Book 4, from 2020 written by Vera Nazarin, mentions the ancient Atlantean ark ship that escaped Earth in the distant past was named Vimana.
 Biman is the name of national airline of Bangladesh, its name is deriving from Sanskrit Vimāna.

See also

Quimbaya artifacts
Vaimanika Shastra
Ratha
Early flying machines
Merkabah mysticism
Vimanavatthu
Laputa
Aviation in India

References

External links
 WorldMysteries.com The Anti-Gravity Handbook (Lost Science) by David Hatcher Childress
Vymanika Shastra
 UFOs and Vimanas
 Los Vimanas'' (a collection of various texts, partially in Spanish and partially in English) http://www.bibliotecapleyades.net/esp_vimanas.htm#inicio
 "Vimana Aircraft of India: More Sloppy Scholarship from David Childress" by Jason Colavito

Objects in Hindu mythology
Flying chariots